Yasi Kand (also Romanized as Yāsī Kand; also known as Yāsī Kandī) is a village in Behi-e Feyzolah Beygi Rural District, in the Central District of Bukan County, West Azerbaijan Province, Iran. At the 2006 census, its population was 149, in 27 families.

References 

Populated places in Bukan County